Bhelsar is a village in Rudauli tehsil, Faizabad district (officially Ayodhya district) in the Indian state of Uttar Pradesh, India. Bhelsar is situated on NH-27 Ayodhya- Barabanki road in Ayodhya, Uttar Pradesh. Rudauli is 3 km away from Bhelsar. And Bhelsar is 39 km west of district headquarters Ayodhya city.

Transport

Road 
Bhelsar is well connected with cities and towns due to good road connectivity. Bhelsar is located near the  Ayodhya - Barabanki NH-27 highway in Ayodhya, Uttar Pradesh. Faizabad, Ayodhya, Barabanki, Gonda are the nearby cities connected well with Bhelsar. Rudauli, Sohawal, Raunahi, Patranga, Milkipur, Kumarganj, Masodha, Bhadarsa, Bikapur, Tarun, Maya Bazar, Goshainganj, Haiderganj and Chaure Bazar are the nearby towns in Ayodhya, Uttar Pradesh.

Railway 
Rudauli railway station is the nearest from Bhelsar which connects with Indian railways. Rudauli, Faizabad Junction, Ayodhya Junction, Barabanki Junction and Goshainganj are the nearby railway stations from Bhelsar, Ayodhya.

Air 
Ayodhya Airport  (Ayodhya) and Chaudhary Charan Singh Airport (Lucknow) are the nearby airports from Bhelsar, Ayodhya.

References

Villages in Faizabad district